The Gebel el-Arak Knife, also Jebel el-Arak Knife, is an ivory and flint knife dating from the Naqada II period of Egyptian prehistory (3500—3200 BC), showing Mesopotamian influence. The knife was purchased in 1914 in Cairo by Georges Aaron Bénédite for the Louvre, where it is now on display in the Sully wing, room 633. At the time of its purchase, the knife handle was alleged by the seller to have been found at the site of Gebel el-Arak, but it is today believed to come from Abydos.

Purchase and origin

Purchase
The Gebel el-Arak knife was bought for the Louvre by the philologist and Egyptologist Georges Aaron Bénédite in February 1914 from a private antique dealer, M. Nahman, in Cairo. Bénédite immediately recognised the artefact's extraordinary state of preservation as well as its archaic date. On 16 March 1914, he wrote to Charles Boreux, then head of the département des Antiquités égyptiennes of the Louvre, about the item the unsuspecting dealer had offered him. It was:
[...] an archaic flint knife with an ivory handle of the greatest beauty. This is the masterpiece of predynastic sculpture [...] executed with remarkable finesse and elegance. This is a work of great detail [...] and the interest of what is represented extends even beyond the artistic value of the artefact. On one side is a hunting scene; on the other a scene of war or a raid. At the top of the hunting scene [...] the hunter wears a large Chaldean garment: he head is covered by a hat like that of our Gudea [...] and he grasps two lions standing against him. You can judge the importance of this asiatic representation [...] we will own one of the most important prehistoric monuments, if not more. It is, in definitive, in tangible and summary form, the first chapter of the history of Egypt (emphasis in the original).Letter of G. Benedite to C. Boreux, Département des Antiquités Egyptiennes, Louvre

At the time of purchase, its blade and handle were separated, as the seller did not realise that they fitted together. Boreux later proposed that the knife be restored, and that the blade and handle be joined together. This was done in March 1933 by Léon André, who worked mainly on consolidating the ensemble, and conserving the ivory handle. The most recent restoration of the knife was undertaken in 1997 by Agnès Cascio and Juliette Lévy.

Provenance 
However, the knife's true provenance is indicated by Bénédite in his letter to Boreux. He wrote:
[...] the seller did not suspect that the flint [blade] belonged with the handle and presented it to me as witness of the recent finds from Abydos. 
That the knife did indeed originate from Abydos is supported by the otherwise total absence of archaeological finds from Gebel el-Arak, while intensive excavations by Émile Amélineau, Flinders Petrie, Édouard Naville and Thomas Eric Peet were taking place at this time at the Umm el-Qa'ab, the necropolis of predynastic and early dynastic rulers in Abydos.

Description

Blade
The blade of the knife is made of homogenous finely grained yellowish flint, a type of Egyptian flint called chert. Chert is widely available in Egypt and appears across the archaeological record as a material in lithic tool usage from the Paleolithic up to the New Kingdom. The blade was produced from the original stone in five stages:
 Roughing of the original stone.
 Preformation of the blade by percussion flaking.
 Polishing of both sides of the blade. This operation is required before the ripple-flaking, see below. One side of the blade was left polished and did not receive further work, thus showing a smooth ground surface, maybe to imitate a metal blade.
 Ripple-flaking on one side of the blade. This consists in uniformly removing long and thin strips of stone with parallel pressure flaking, creating a regular pattern of S undulations on the surface of the stone. Analysis of the shock waves on the surface of the blade reveals they were produced from the top to the bottom of the blade and from left to right, in a counterclockwise fashion. This work was probably made with pointed copper tools. The ripple-flaking of this side of the blade has no incidence on its sharpness, indicating that it may have served an artistic purpose.
 Fine serration of the edge of the blade by micro-flaking. This step produces the sharpness of the blade.

The blade of the Gebel el-Arak knife as well as of other ripple-flake knives of the same period are considered the high point of the silex tool making techniques. Specialists of the Predynastic period of Egypt, such as Béatrix Midant-Reynes, argue that the quality and amount of work required for the creation of the blade goes beyond what is required for a functional knife. Thus the purpose and value of the knife would be artistic, the blade being a demonstration of technical skills aiming at the beauty of the result. This hypothesis is strengthened by a detailed use-wear analysis of the blade which demonstrates that the knife has never been used.

The blade weights 92.3 grams, its precise dimensions are as follows:

Handle
The handle is made of the ivory of an elephant tusk, and not from a hippopotamus canine tooth as was first thought. The handle was carved along the axis of the tusk, as evidenced by a dark spot located above the head of the "Master of Animals", which is the tip of pulp cavity of the tusk. Once extracted from the tusk, the handle was polished on both sides and hollowed out to receive the blade. At the bottom of the handle, the edge was beveled, and probably received a crimp of precious metal that would have reinforced the assemblage of the handle with the blade. At the time of the purchase, Bénédite reported that he could see traces of gold leaf on the bottom of the handle, but this is now gone. The assemblage supports the hypothesis that the knife was not functional: the tang of the blade is too short and the handle too thin for the knife to have been practical.

The handle is richly carved in low relief with a scene of a battle on the side that would have faced a right-handed user and with mythological themes on the other side. This side has a knob in its centre through which a strap could be passed. The carvings were executed on the polished surface of the tusk with a silex microburin from top to bottom, one register after the other. The artisan first carved the main figures and then carved the places where the figures meet, such as the arms of the combatants. The depth of the carvings does not exceed .

Some authors consider that the knob or boss had to be worn outward, which implies that the side with the knob should be considered at the front face, and the smooth side as the back face.

The precise dimensions of the handle are as follows:

Reliefs

The handle of the knife is carved on both sides with finely executed figures arranged in five horizontal registers. The side of the handle with the knob shows Mesopotamian influence featuring the Master of Animals motif, very common in Mesopotamian art, in the form of a figure wearing Mesopotamian clothing flanked by two upright lions symbolising the Morning and Evening Stars (now both identified with the planet Venus). Robert du Mesnil du Buisson said the central figure is the god El. David Rohl identifies him with Meskiagkasher (Biblical Cush), who "journeyed upon the sea and came ashore at the mountains".Nicolas Grimal refrains from speculating on the identity of the ambiguous figure, referring to it as a "warrior". Modern scholarship generally attributes the back reliefs to Mesopotamian influence, and more specifically attribute the design of the clothed wrestler to the Mesopotamian "priest-king" Master of Animals images of the Late Uruk period. Similar portraits of men with beards and torus-like headgear also appear on numerous figurines of the Naqada I period and dated to 3800-3400 BCE. These figurines are generally carved on ivory tusks and seemingly wear long cloaks.

The fighting figurines are armed with flint knives, clubs and also pear-shaped maces, which are considered as an innovation introduced from Mesopotamia, replacing the initial Egyptian disk-shaped mace. Some authors have suggested that the reliefs represent a battle between warriors of the cities of Abydos and Hierakonpolis, the two main rival Egyptian cities of the period, and that the victor was Abydos, the presence of the lion-fighting Mesopotamian king remaining unexplained and attributed to artistic influence from Mesopotamia. In effect, most of Egypt became unified under rulers from Abydos during the Naqada III period.

This side of the handle also contains a "knob", a perforated suspension lug that would have supported the knife handle, keeping it level while resting on a level surface and also could have been used to thread a cord to hang it from the body as an ornament.

Another knife with very similar iconography, including depictions of warriors, prisoners and nearly identical types of ships can be seen in the Metropolitan Museum of Art (Accession number: 26.241.1). Numerous objects from the Naqada II period are similar to the Gebel el-Arak Knife in style and content.

Parallels
Several of the themes and designs visible in the Gebel el-Arak knife, can also be seen in other contemporary Egyptian works of art, such as the fresco from Tomb 100 at Hierakonpolis (c. 3500-3200 BCE), with the scene of the Master of animals, showing a man fighting against two lions, the individual fighting scenes or the boats. Stylistically, the Gebel el-Arak Knife belongs to an important group of Naqada II ivory carvings.

Some of the figures found in Hierakonpolis, or the enemies of the Bull Palette, also dated to the same period, show similarities, such as the penile sheath worn by men.

Similar knives 
Today a total of 17 similar ceremonial knives with decorated handles are known. These knives comprise:

 The ritual knife of the Brooklyn Museum, discovered by Jacques de Morgan in the Tomb 32 at Abu Zeidan near Edfu, and similar in size to the Gebel el-Arak knife. The handle of the knife, made of elephant ivory, is decorated with 227 animals carved in 10 registers on both faces. The figures are tightly packed and entirely cover the handle. They represent real animals, all depicted at approximatively the same size and arranged in processions by species: elephants (some walking on snakes), storks, lions, oryxes and bovids. Other less common animals interrupt the processions: a giraffe, a heron, a bustard and a dog chasing after an oryx. Finally, two electric catfish are represented on the outer margin of the handle. The only non-animal figure is a rosette, a royal symbol of Mesopotamian origin found on Egyptian artifacts of the predynastic period and until the 1st dynasty, such as the Scorpion Macehead and Narmer palette. The decoration of the handle is very similar to that of a predynastic hair comb, on display at the Metropolitan Museum of Art.
 The Pitt-Rivers knife, bought in the mid 19th century by Reverend G. Chester from an antique dealer who reported finding it in Sheikh Hamada, near Sohag in Upper Egypt. The knife dates back to the late predynastic period, from ca. 3300 BC to 3100 BC, and is now on display at the British Museum's Early Egypt gallery, room 64, under the catalog number EA 68512. The blade of the knife is virtually identical in style to that of the Gebel el-Arak knife, although slightly larger. The iconography of the handle is similar to that of the ritual knife, comprising six rows of wild animals carved in raised relief. The animals include elephants walking on snakes, storks, a heron, lions followed by a dog, short and long-horned cattle, perhaps jackals, an ibis, a deer, hartebeests, oryxes and a barbary sheep. Similar motifs are found on pottery and clay seals from funerary contexts of the predynastic and early dynastic periods, most notably in Abydos.
 The Gebel-Tarif knife, dating to the Naqada III period. On one side, the handle of the knife shows two snakes encircling rosettes. The other side is arranged in four rows. The top and second rows depict scenes of predation with a leopard and a lion attacking ibexes. Beneath these is a domesticated heavy hunting dog wearing a collar pursued by a lion or another dog. Finally the bottom row represents a griffin and an ibex The knife is now in the Egyptian Museum under the catalog number CG 14265.

Two worn and battered knives can be found at the Metropolitan Museum of Art and at the National Archaeological Museum (France).

The perfect similarity between the blades of these knives and that of the Gebel el-Arak led scholar Diane L. Holmes to propose that the knives were all produced by a small number of workshops in one area and may be the product of a few craftsmen who practised this extremely specialized skill over a period of a few generations.

References

Further reading

External links 

 The Gebel el Arak knife, Images on the backside of the handle
 The Gebel el Arak knife, Depiction of a predynastic battle scene
 A complete narrative of the events portrayed on the Gebel el-Arak knife.
  Poignard "du Gebel el-Arak", official site of the Louvre.

4th-millennium BC works
1914 archaeological discoveries
Art of ancient Egypt
Egyptian antiquities of the Louvre
Near East and Middle East antiquities of the Louvre
Sculpture of the Ancient Near East
31st century BC
Knives
Prehistoric Egypt
Individual weapons
Uruk period
Gerzeh culture